Line 1000 is one of CFR's main lines in Romania having a total of 59 km and passing through important cities like Bucharest, Buftea and Ploieşti.

Secondary lines
1000 Bucharest (north) - Basarab - Buftea - Periș - Brazi - Ploieşti South - Ploieşti North (59 km).

References

Railway lines in Romania
Standard gauge railways in Romania